Santonica may refer to:

 Santonica, the common name for a plant (Artemisia cina)
 Santonin, a drug formerly used to expel intestinal worms